The Free Press is an American, English language daily newspaper based in Kinston, Lenoir County, North Carolina.  It has served the city of Kinston and Lenoir County, North Carolina since 1882. The Free Press was owned by Freedom Communications until 2012, when Freedom sold its Florida and North Carolina papers to Halifax Media Group. In November 2014, Halifax announced the sale of The Free Press and its other properties to New Media Investment Group Inc. In 2015, Halifax was acquired by New Media Investment Group, which was merged into Gannett in 2019.

Printing
It was a broadsheet-format daily until June 1, 2009, when it and two sister dailies, the New Bern, North Carolina Sun Journal and the Jacksonville, North Carolina Daily News converted to a berliner-style format. Since the format change all three papers are laid out and are published in Jacksonville.

The Free Press (and its sister publications in New Bern and Jacksonville) returned to the broadsheet format on May 1, 2014, after readers requested the change.

The Free Press is available on the Internet ( for full access) and on Facebook for dissemination of news and interaction with readers.

History

The Free Press was founded in 1882 by Josephus and his brother Charles Daniels. The newspaper was an active supporter of Grover Cleveland and the Democratic party.  The name has changed several times since then.
 The Kinston Free Press (1882–1923), 
 The Daily Free Press (1902–1923), 
 The Kinston Free Press (1882–1923, 
 The Daily Free Press (1902–1923), 
 The Kinston Daily Free Press (1923–1991), 
 The Free Press (1991–current), 

In November 2022 Paxton Media Group acquired The Free Press and five other North Carolina newspapers from Gannett Co., Inc.

Awards
The Free Press is a member of the North Carolina Press Association.  The Free Press won 47 North Carolina Press Association awards from 2010 to 2012, the most in a three-year period in the paper's history. It was named the top newspaper in North Carolina's Class D (Daily, 12,000-and-under) in 2014.

See also
 List of newspapers in North Carolina

References

Lenoir County, North Carolina
Daily newspapers published in North Carolina
Publications established in 1882
Gannett publications